A religious order is a lineage of communities and organizations of people who live in some way set apart from society in accordance with their specific religious devotion, usually characterized by the principles of its founder's religious practice. It is usually composed of laypeople and, in some orders, clergy. Such orders exist in many of the world's religions.

Buddhism

In Buddhist societies, a religious order is one of the number of monastic orders of monks and nuns, many of which follow a certain school of teaching—such as Thailand's Dhammayuttika order, a monastic order founded by King Mongkut (Rama IV). A well-known Chinese Buddhist order is the ancient Shaolin order in Ch'an (Zen) Buddhism; and in modern times, the Order of Hsu Yun.

Christianity

Catholic tradition

A Catholic religious institute is a society whose members (referred to as "religious") pronounce vows that are accepted by a superior in the name of the Catholic Church, who wear a religious habit and who live a life of brothers or sisters in common. Catholic religious orders and congregations are their two historical categories. Religious institutes are distinct from secular institutes, another kind of institute of consecrated life, and from lay ecclesial movements.

In the Catholic Church, members of religious institutes, unless they are also deacons or priests in Holy Orders, are not clergy but belong to the laity. While the state of consecrated life is neither clerical nor lay, institutes themselves are classified as one or the other, a clerical institute being one that "by reason of the purpose or design intended by the founder or by virtue of legitimate tradition, is under the direction of clerics, assumes the exercise of sacred orders, and is recognized as such by the authority of the Church".

Well-known Roman Catholic religious institutes, not all of which were classified as "orders" rather than "congregations", include Augustinians, Basilians, Benedictines, Bethlehemites, Bridgettines, Camaldolese, Carmelites, Carthusians, Cistercians, Conceptionists, Crosiers, Dominicans, Franciscans, Hieronymites, Jesuits, Minims, Piarists, Salesians, Olivetans, Theatines, Trappists and the Visitandines.

 Several religious orders evolved during the Crusades to incorporate a military mission became "religious military orders", such as the Knights of the Order of Saint John of Jerusalem, the Knights of the Order of the Temple and the Knights of the Holy Sepulchre.

Non-monastic religious institutes typically have a motherhouse or generalate with jurisdiction over any number of dependent religious communities, whose members may be moved by their superior general to its other communities as the institute's needs require.

In accordance with the concept of independent communities in the Rule of Saint Benedict, the Benedictines have autonomous abbeys (so-called "independent houses"). Their members profess "stability" to the abbeys where they make their religious vows; hence their abbots or abbesses may not move them to other abbeys. An "independent house" may occasionally make a new foundation which remains a "dependent house" (identified by the name "priory") until it is granted independence by Rome and itself becomes an abbey. Each house's autonomy does not prevent it being affiliated into a congregation—whether national or based on some other joint characteristic—and these, in turn, form the supra-national Benedictine Confederation.

Orthodox tradition

In the Eastern Orthodox Church, therre is only one type of monasticism. The profession of monastics is known as tonsure (referring to the ritual cutting of the monastic's hair which takes place during the service) and is considered by monks to be a Sacred Mystery (Sacrament). The Rite of Tonsure is printed in the Euchologion (Church Slavonic: Trebnik), the same book as the other Sacred Mysteries and services performed according to need.

Lutheran tradition

Martin Luther had concerns with the spiritual value of monastic life at the time of the Reformation. After the foundation of the Lutheran Churches, some monasteries in Lutheran lands (such as Amelungsborn Abbey near Negenborn and Loccum Abbey in Rehburg-Loccum) and convents (such as Ebstorf Abbey near the town of Uelzen and Bursfelde Abbey in Bursfelde) adopted the Lutheran Christian faith.

Other examples of Lutheran religious orders include the "Order of Lutheran Franciscans" in the United States.  Also, a Lutheran religious order following the Rule of St. Benedict, "The Congregation of the Servants of Christ," was established at St. Augustine's House in Oxford, Michigan, in 1958 when some other men joined Father Arthur Kreinheder in observing the monastic life and offices of prayer. This order has strong ties to Lutheran Benedictine orders in Sweden (Östanbäck Monastery) and in Germany (Priory of St. Wigbert).

Anglican tradition

Religious orders in England were dissolved by King Henry VIII upon the separation of the English church from Roman primacy.  For three hundred years, there were no formal religious orders in Anglicanism, although some informal communities – such as the Little Gidding community – occasionally sprang into being.  With the advent of the Oxford Movement in the Church of England and worldwide Anglicanism in the middle of the 19th century, several orders appeared.  In 1841, the first order for women was established. The first order for men was founded 25 years later.

Anglican religious voluntarily commit themselves for life, or a term of years, to holding their possessions in common or in trust; to a celibate life in community; and obedience to their Rule and Constitution.

There are presently thirteen active religious orders for men, fifty-three for women, and eight mixed gender.

Methodist tradition
The Methodist Church of Great Britain, and its ancestors, have established a number of orders of Deaconesses, who are ordained as both regular and secular clergy. The Methodist Diaconal Order (MDO) currently admits both men and women to the Order. Since the functions of a deacon are primarily pastoral, the MDO may therefore be regarded as an order of Regular clerics.

The Order of Saint Luke is a religious order in the United Methodist Church dedicated to sacramental and liturgical scholarship, education, and practice.

Anabaptist tradition
Some Protestant religious orders follow Anabaptist theology. These would include the Hutterites and Bruderhof, who live in full community of goods and living as a peace church.

Jehovah's Witnesses
Among their corporations, the Religious Order of Jehovah's Witnesses cares for matters specific to Jehovah's Witnesses special full-time servants. In a particular branch, traveling overseers, special pioneers, and branch staff are considered members of the Order of Special Full-time Servants and the Bethel Family. Globally, their order is the Worldwide Order of Special Full-Time Servants of Jehovah’s Witnesses. Male and female members of such religious orders typically make a formal vow of poverty and are granted certain status and exemptions by many governments. While Jehovah's Witnesses do not consider members of their religious orders to be a clergy separate from other Witnesses, who are also ordained ministers, they do recognize that a government may consider them such for administrative purposes.

Jehovah's Witnesses do not have a separate clergy class, but consider an adherent's qualified baptism to constitute his ordination as a minister. Governments have generally recognized that Jehovah's Witnesses' full-time appointees qualify as ministers regardless of sex or appointment as an elder or deacon ("ministerial servant"); the religion itself asserts what is sometimes termed "ecclesiastical privilege" only for its appointed elders.

Islam

Sufis

A tariqah is how a religious order is described in Sufism. It especially refers to the mystical teaching and spiritual practices of such an order with the aim of seeking   ḥaqīqah "ultimate truth". Such tariqas typically have a murshid (guide) who plays the role of leader or spiritual director. Members and followers of a tariqa  are known as murīdīn (singular murīd), meaning "desirous", viz. "desiring the knowledge of knowing God and loving God" (also called a faqīr ). Tariqas have silsilas which is the spiritual lineage of the Shaikhs of that order. Almost all orders trace their silsila back to the Islamic prophet Muhammad. Tariqas are spread all over the Muslim world.

Shia
Among Shias, Noorbakshia Islam is an order that blends Sufi principles with Shia doctrine. It claims to trace its direct spiritual lineage and chain (silsilah) to the Islamic prophet Muhammad through Ali, the first imam of Shia Islam.

Salafi
There is some historical connection between certain schools of Sufism and the development of Wahhabism and Salafism due to the history of these denominations.

Ibn Abd al-Wahhab was inspired by Ibn Taymiyyah, a 14th-century scholar and dedicated Sufi, who is however remembered mainly as an outspoken critic of the excesses of certain schools of Sufism during his time.

Judaism

Other traditions

A form of ordered religious living is common also in many tribes and religions of Africa and South America, though on a smaller scale, and some parts of England. Due to the unorganized character of these small religious groups, orders are not as visible as in other well-organised religions.

See also
 Asceticism
 Enclosed religious orders
 Monasticism
 Mendicancy
 Religion-supporting organization

Notes

External links
 
 List of Contemplative Men's Monasteries in the United States
 List of Contemplative Women's Monasteries in the United States
 VocationNetwork.org information about Catholic religious communities and life as a sister, brother, or priest.
 DigitalVocationGuide.org digital edition of VISION, the annual Catholic religious vocation discernment guide.
 Abbot Gasquet, Full Text + Illustrations, Religious Orders of England.